In the Absence of Light is the second album by black metal band Abigail Williams. The album was released in North America on September 28, 2010. The album moves away from the symphonic black metal sound and keyboard usage featured on In the Shadow of a Thousand Suns to a more standard black metal sound.

Track listing

Personnel
 Ken Sorceron – vocals, guitar, bass, keyboards
 Ian Jekelis – guitar
 Ken Bedene – drums

Additional Personnel
 Christophe Szpajdel – logo

References

2010 albums
Abigail Williams (band) albums
Candlelight Records albums